UB8 may refer to:

 UB8, a postcode district in the UB postcode area
 SM UB-8, World War I German submarine